The 2012 IZOD IndyCar Series was the 17th season of the IndyCar Series, and the 101st season of American open wheel racing. Its premier event was the 96th Indianapolis 500, held on Sunday, May 27. The series was sanctioned by IndyCar, and took place in three countries on two continents. Chevrolet returned to the series for the first time since 2005 while Lotus debuted, with the latter leaving the IndyCar Series after the 2012 season due to poor performance.

Three-time defending IndyCar champion Dario Franchitti entered the season seeking his fourth consecutive championship and fifth overall. Meanwhile, two-time championship runner up Will Power sought his first title. Heading into the final race of the season, Power led Ryan Hunter-Reay by 17 points in a two driver fight for the championship.  After Power wrecked on lap 55, Hunter-Reay was able to finish 4th, and claimed the championship by 3 points.

Among the numerous stories going into the season was the departure of Danica Patrick, who left IndyCar to compete in the NASCAR Nationwide Series. Joining the series was former Formula One driver Rubens Barrichello. A highlight of the season was the introduction of a new chassis and engine package.

After losing Las Vegas as a venue in the aftermath of the death of Dan Wheldon, the series welcomed the return of such venues as Detroit and Fontana. In addition, midway through the season, the inaugural Indy Qingdao 600 scheduled to take place in China was cancelled by the promoter.

It was a triumphant return for Chevrolet after returning from 6 years absence, and an average year for Honda topped by an unexpectedly good performance at the 500 after poor qualifying and thus Chevrolet ending Japanese engine manufacturer nine-year supremacy.

The ICONIC Project

The 2012 season saw the implementation of IndyCar's new ICONIC Plan (Innovative, Competitive, Open-wheel, New, Industry-relevant, Cost-effective), the biggest change to the sport in recent history. The car used through 2011, a 2003/2007-model Dallara IR-05, and normally aspirated V8 engines (required since 1997) were permanently retired. The ICONIC committee was composed of experts and executives from racing and technical fields: Randy Bernard, William R. Looney III, Brian Barnhart, Gil de Ferran, Tony Purnell, Eddie Gossage, Neil Ressler, Tony Cotman and Rick Long. IndyCar accepted proposals from BAT Engineering, Dallara, DeltaWing, Lola and Swift for chassis design. On July 14, 2010, the final decision was made public, with organisers accepting the Dallara proposal.

New chassis
Under the new ICONIC regulations, all teams will compete with a core rolling chassis, called the "IndyCar Safety Cell", developed by Italian designer Dallara. Teams will then outfit the chassis with separate body work, referred to as "Aero Kits", which consist of front and rear wings, sidepods, and engine cowlings. Development of Aero Kits is open to any manufacturer, with all packages to be made available to all teams for a maximum price. ICONIC committee member Tony Purnell gave an open invitation to car manufacturers and companies such as Lockheed Martin and GE to develop kits.

The IndyCar Safety cell will be capped at a price of $349,000 and will be assembled at a new Dallara facility in Speedway, Indiana. Aero Kits will be capped at $70,000. Teams have the option of buying a complete Dallara safety cell/aero kit for a discounted price.

On May 12, 2011, Dallara unveiled the first concept cars, one apiece in oval and road course Aero Kit configuration.

On April 30, 2011, IndyCar owners voted 15–0 to reject the introduction of multiple Aero Kits for the 2012 season, citing costs. Owners expressed their desire to introduce the new chassis/engines for 2012, but have all participants use the Dallara aerodynamic package in 2012, and delay the introduction of multiple aero kits until 2013. On August 14, 2011, IndyCar confirmed that the introduction of multiple Aero Kits would be delayed until 2013 for "economic reasons," and furthermore, it was put off for 2013 as well. Chevrolet and Lotus had already announced their intention to build aero kits.

2011 Indianapolis 500 winner Dan Wheldon carried out the first official test of the Dallara chassis at Mid-Ohio in August 2011. Following Wheldon's death at the season-ending race in Las Vegas, Dallara announced that the 2012 chassis would be named the DW12 in his honor.

Despite the generational change of chassis and engines, the wheel rim and Firestone Firehawk tire sizes would remain same until at least 2024 season.

Fuel cell capacity

Engine formula

Turbochargers returned to the IndyCar Series for the first time since the IRL 1996 and Champ Car 2007 seasons respectively. All engines will run E85 fuel; from 2007 to 2011, the series utilized 100% fuel grade ethanol.
The turbochargers are provided by BorgWarner. The third generation of IndyCar Series engines will be used until 2023 season.

Suppliers
On November 12, 2010, Chevrolet was confirmed as an engine supplier for 2012 with a twin turbo V6. The initial list of potential suppliers included Ford, Cosworth, and Mazda. Honda announced a 2.2-liter turbo V6 developed fully by Honda Performance Development. On May 27, 2011, Ganassi and Honda announced their partnership renewal for 2012. On August 19, 2010, Cosworth announced their interest in providing an inline-four engine, however, the plan was eventually scrapped. The Chevrolet engine is built in a joint effort with Ilmor who last time partnered Chevrolet in 1997-2002 (1997-2001 as Oldsmobile) and Honda in 2003–2011, and was introduced in full-works partnership with Penske Racing.

The third engine supplier was announced November 18, 2010 at the LA Auto Show, just prior to the league deadline. Lotus announced a twin turbo V6 engine and an Aero Kit. built in a partnership with John Judd and Jack Brabham (Engine Developments Ltd.) Judd engines were used in the CART series and at the Indy 500 from 1987 to 1992, as well as in sports car racing and F1. Lotus has suffered difficulty in both power and delivery of engines and has since pulled out of the sport.

Confirmed engine suppliers
Chevrolet
Honda
Lotus
The arrival of Chevrolet and Lotus as IndyCar Series engine suppliers were marked the return of multiple engine suppliers since 2005 season when Chevrolet and Toyota were Honda engine competitors.

Rule changes
Any engine changes for an engine that has run less than 1,850 miles will result in 10-place grid penalty at the next race. Further, full-time entries are limited to 5 engines per season. There will be two exceptions:
If an engine fails during a race, in which a new engine may be installed for the next event without penalty.
At Indianapolis, all engine penalties will be served at the next race at Detroit. Further, all full-time season entries will receive a new engine penalty-free between Bump Day & Carb Day.
Beginning at Long Beach for all remaining road/street course events, the pits will remain open throughout non-emergency full-course cautions periods. Previously the pits immediately closed upon the display of the caution flag. The series hopes this will shorten caution periods to as few as two laps.
Also beginning at Long Beach for all remaining road/street course events, cars that are not on the lead lap during an upcoming restart in the final 20 laps will peel off and drive through pit lane on the speed limiter and cycle back to the end of the line. The rule was later expanded to oval races as well, where lead-lap cars will simply drive to the front in position order instead. This is similar to NASCAR's restart procedure, where all lapped cars must move to the rear of the field.
For the races at Indianapolis, Texas, and California, restarts will revert to single-file in response to safety concerns.

Schedule
The 2012 schedule included the following 15 races:

 Oval

 Road course/Street circuit

Schedule development

Existing race contracts
The Honda Grand Prix of St. Petersburg will continue through 2013. City officials look to extend the contract through 2014.
Barber Motorsports Park signed a three-year deal through 2012.
An agreement has been signed with the city of Long Beach to extend the Toyota Grand Prix of Long Beach to 2015 with an option through 2020.
The São Paulo Indy 300 has a contract through 2019.
The Honda Indy Toronto has renewed its contracts through 2014.
The Edmonton Indy has a contract in place through 2013.
 The contract for the Baltimore Grand Prix runs through 2015. However, an issue with the promoter has been in dispute and a new promoter was scheduled to be announced in mid-February. In May 2012, it was announced that Race On LLP and Andretti Sports Marketing had reached a five-year agreement with the City of Baltimore.
 Michael Andretti has been announced as the new promoter of the Milwaukee 225. The race, not originally on the INDYCAR schedule, was announced February 10, and is now known as the Milwaukee IndyFest.

New/Returning races
 Detroit Belle Isle Grand Prix returns to the schedule for 2012, having been removed after the 2008 event.
 The series will return to Auto Club Speedway in Fontana, California for a 500-mile night race on Saturday, September 15, 2012.

Potential races
 A fifteen-race calendar was announced in December 2011; however, amid speculation of a race being organized in Fort Lauderdale, it was reported in January 2012 that the series needed sixteen races in order to fulfill obligations to sponsors.
 After the cancellation of the China race, it was believed that IndyCar would need to replace it to fulfill sponsorship obligations. Road America, Mazda Raceway Laguna Seca, Michigan, and a second race at Texas were considered. However, on June 25, IndyCar announced that the schedule would remain at 15 races.

Discontinued races
The series did not return to the New Hampshire Motor Speedway in 2012.
The Indy Japan 300 did not return in 2012.
The series did not return to the Kentucky Speedway after IndyCar failed to reach an agreement with the track.
Las Vegas Motor Speedway was removed from the calendar in the aftermath of Dan Wheldon's death.

Cancelled race
 The series was supposed to visit China for the first time; the Indy Qingdao 600 was to be held on a 3.87-mile street circuit in Qingdao over the weekend of August 19, with plans to build a permanent road course for future seasons. However, this race was cancelled by the promoter on June 13.

Confirmed entries
All chassis are composed of a Dallara DW-12 "IndyCar Safety Cell" base and aerokit in 2012. All teams will run Firestone tires.

Notes
(R) – Rookie
1. Charlie Kimball broke his hand in an accident while testing at Mid-Ohio on July 26. Pantano replaced Kimball for the subsequent race at Mid-Ohio.
2. Team Barracuda – BHA, Dreyer & Reinbold Racing and Dragon Racing terminated their Lotus engine contracts prior to the Indianapolis 500.
3. Dragon Racing was reduced to a single-car team following the Indianapolis 500, as engine supplier Chevrolet could not supply engines for both cars.
4. Dreyer & Reinbold Racing formed a strategic alliance with Panther Racing prior to the Indianapolis 500, and obtained Panther's second Chevrolet engine contract.
5. Team Barracuda – BHA skipped the São Paulo race to concentrate on preparations for the Indy 500.
6. Josef Newgarden broke his left index finger in an accident during the Sonoma race. Junqueira replaced Newgarden for the following race at Baltimore.

Team and driver changes
Team Penske: Team utilized full-works Chevrolet engines beginning in 2012 and thus Team Penske earned full-factory support from Chevrolet including free engines and official road vehicles. The entire three car team returns full-time in 2012. Briscoe will switch numbers from #6 to #2.
Chip Ganassi Racing: Team utilized Honda engines in 2012. The entire four-car team will return in 2012.
Andretti Autosport: The team utilized customer Chevrolet engines in 2012. Marco Andretti will be in the third year of a 4-year contract with the team in 2012 Ryan Hunter-Reay signed with Andretti Autosport through the 2012 season. 2011 driver Danica Patrick left the team to compete in the Nationwide series full-time along with limited Sprint Cup Schedule. The team announced on August 26, 2011 that GoDaddy will return as a primary sponsor through 2013. Andretti confirmed that Dan Wheldon had signed a deal with Andretti to replace Patrick in the #7 GoDaddy car, but was killed at Las Vegas. James Hinchcliffe drove the GoDaddy car, and the number switched from #7 to #27, the same used by fellow Canadian drivers Gilles Villeneuve and Jacques Villeneuve. The team confirmed Sebastián Saavedra and Ana Beatriz for the Indy 500.
Newman/Haas Racing: The team announced that it would not contest the full 2012 season on December 1, 2011. Jean Alesi was announced to drive for the team at the Indianapolis 500. The entry was later withdrawn.
Sam Schmidt Motorsports: The team ran Honda engines in 2012. The team announced Simon Pagenaud as its first driver on December 8 and that a second full-time car was "likely", but Pagenaud was the team's lone entry to start the season. On May 3, 2012, the team confirmed that Townsend Bell would drive the #99 car for Schmidt Pelfrey Motorsports.
A. J. Foyt Enterprises: Mike Conway replaces Vítor Meira as the team driver. The team ran Honda engines in 2012. The team confirmed Wade Cunningham for the Indy 500.
Panther Racing: J. R. Hildebrand signed a multi-year deal in 2011 to drive the #4 National Guard car for the team.
KV Racing Technology: The team ran Chevrolet engines in 2012. Driver Tony Kanaan signed a multi-year contract to return to the team in 2012. The team confirmed the return of E. J. Viso, switching to the #5 car. Rubens Barrichello was confirmed to be driving the full season with the team at a press conference in Brazil on March 1.
Dreyer & Reinbold Racing: In November, the team announced that they had signed on as a Lotus works team for 2012. Oriol Servià signed to be one of the team's drivers, but efforts to field a second entry failed to materialize.
HVM Racing: Simona de Silvestro returned as a full-time driver for the team in 2012. The team was the anchor team for the new Lotus engines in 2012.
Dale Coyne Racing: Owner Dale Coyne confirmed that the team would return with two cars in 2012, with Honda engines. Justin Wilson and James Jakes both returned.
Conquest Racing: While Éric Bachelart stated the team will have at least one full-time car in 2012. Difficulties securing an engine lease and a subsequent American Le Mans Series LMP2 program kept Conquest's IndyCar plans on hold.
Rahal Letterman Lanigan Racing: The team purchased two DW12 chassis. The cars were be powered by Honda engines. The team confirmed Takuma Sato as one of their drivers in early February 2012. The team confirmed a second car at the Indy 500, to be driven by Michel Jourdain Jr.
Bryan Herta Autosport: The team budgeted money to buy two Dallara DW12 chassis. The team confirmed Alex Tagliani on January 9, 2012.
Sarah Fisher Hartman Racing: Driver Ed Carpenter has left to form his own team. 2011 Indy Lights champ Josef Newgarden was the team's driver for 2012. The team will be powered by Honda engines. The team confirmed Bryan Clauson for the Indy 500.
Dragon Racing: The team intended to run two full-time cars, with drivers Sébastien Bourdais and Katherine Legge. The team will be powered by Lotus engines. Legge has signed a multi-year deal with the team to drive the #6 car. However, after switching from Lotus to Chevrolet engines, they were forced to contract to a single entry after the Indianapolis 500.
MSR Indy: The team is owned by Mike Shank, A. J. Allmendinger, and Columbus area businessman Brian Bailey. The team was intended to use Lotus engines. The team has purchased a DW12 chassis with the goal of running a full-time IndyCar program in 2012, and took delivery of their chassis on December 15. Unfortunately, the team did not secure the necessary funding to begin the season with often rumored, but never confirmed, driver Paul Tracy. The team originally confirmed Jay Howard for the Indy 500, but Shank released Howard in early May due to the inability to get an engine.
Ed Carpenter Racing: Driver Ed Carpenter and his stepfather Tony George formed a new team, Ed Carpenter Racing. Carpenter was the full-time driver in 2012. The team confirmed a second car for the Indy 500, but the entry was later withdrawn.

Testing
The first official test of the Dallara DW12 chassis was carried out by Dan Wheldon at Mid-Ohio on August 8, 2011. Phase I of testing involved Wheldon, and was planned to involve three road courses and three ovals, over a total of about twelve days. The second test was held August 18 at Barber, and the third was held on the USGP road course at Indianapolis on September 1. Oval tests took place in September at Iowa and Indianapolis.

Honda (Scott Dixon) and Chevrolet (Will Power) began Phase II of on-track testing at Mid-Ohio in early October. A scheduled test at Las Vegas was cancelled after the fatal crash of Dan Wheldon. Testing resumed in late October and continued through February at several venues including Sebring, Fontana, Homestead, Phoenix, and Sonoma. Lotus first took to the track on January 12 at Palm Beach, and testing by individual teams began on January 16.

A full-field official open test took place on March 5–6 & 8–9, 2012 at Sebring International Raceway.

Full-field oval open tests are scheduled for April 4, 2012 at Indianapolis Motor Speedway and for May 7, 2012 at Texas Motor Speedway.

Race summaries

Round 1 – St. Petersburg

Round 2 – Barber

Round 3 – Long Beach

Round 4 – São Paulo

Round 5 – Indianapolis

Round 6 – Detroit

Round 7 – Texas

Round 8 – Milwaukee

Round 9 – Iowa

Round 10 – Toronto

Round 11 – Edmonton

Round 12 – Mid-Ohio

Round 13 – Sonoma

Round 14 – Baltimore

Round 15 – Fontana

Season Summary

Race results

Final driver standings 

 Extra points awarded for qualifying at Indianapolis based on drivers performance.
 Ties in points broken by number of wins, followed by number of 2nds, 3rds, etc., and then by number of pole positions, followed by number of times qualified 2nd, etc.

Manufacturers' Championship

 Manufacturers' Championship points are awarded based on the finishing position of the highest finishing car of each respective manufacturer at each round.

Broadcasting 
For 2012, as in recent years, the IndyCar Series schedule split its television coverage between ESPN on ABC and NBC Sports Network (formerly Versus). The season finale returned to NBC Sports Network after airing on ABC in 2011.

As a result of logistics, NBC Sports Network aired 2012 Summer Olympics coverage during the time and ESPN's broadcast and production crew were working the NASCAR Nationwide Series U.S. Cellular 250 during a split race weekend for the two NASCAR national series), the August 5 race at Mid Ohio that aired on ABC used the NBC Sports Network crew.

In addition to qualifying and race broadcasts, NBC Sports Network aired IndyCar 36, a documentary series based on NBC's 36 format. Each 30-minute episode features a driver's race weekend. The drivers selected were:
 Tony Kanaan (St. Petersburg)
 Graham Rahal (Barber)
 Ryan Hunter-Reay (Long Beach)
 J. R. Hildebrand (Indianapolis qualifying)
 Hélio Castroneves (Indianapolis 500-Mile Race)
 Charlie Kimball (Texas)
 Ed Carpenter (Iowa)
 James Hinchcliffe (Toronto)
 Simon Pagenaud (Mid-Ohio)
 Will Power (Sonoma)
 Oriol Servià (Baltimore)
 Josef Newgarden (Fontana)
No shows were produced at São Paulo, Detroit, Milwaukee or Edmonton, whereas frontrunners Ryan Briscoe, Dario Franchitti and Scott Dixon were not featured.

Footnotes

References

IndyCar Series seasons
IndyCar
 
IndyCar
IndyCar Series